The National Lacrosse League entry draft is an annual event where the general managers of National Lacrosse League teams choose eligible players for their rosters from US college programs and Canada's junior lacrosse system.

A player is deemed eligible for the draft if he is 21 years of age, or is less than 21 years of age and has used or given up all NCAA or NAIA eligibility.

NLL 1st Round Draft Selections

2022 NLL 
The 2022 entry draft took place on September 10, 2022 at The Carlu in Toronto. 104 players were selected in 6 rounds.

2021 NLL 
The 2021 entry draft took place on August 28, 2021 virtually with 6 Rounds and 90 players selected.

2020 NLL
The 2020 entry draft took place on September 17, 2020 virtually with 6 Rounds and 93 players selected.

2019 NLL
The 2019 entry draft took place on September 17, 2019 at Xfinity Live! in Philadelphia, Pennsylvania.

2018 NLL
The 2018 entry draft took place on September 25, 2018 at Xfinity Live! in Philadelphia, Pennsylvania.

2017 NLL
The 2017 entry draft took place on September 18, 2017 at the Toronto Rock Athletic Centre in Oakville, Ontario.

2016 NLL
The 2016 entry draft took place on September 26, 2016 at the Toronto Rock Athletic Centre in Toronto.

2015 NLL
The 2015 entry draft took place on September 28, 2015 at the Toronto Rock Athletic Centre in Toronto.

2014 NLL
The 2014 entry draft took place on September 16, 2014 at the Toronto Rock Athletic Centre in Oakville.

2013 NLL
The 2013 entry draft took place on September 16, 2013 at the Toronto Rock Athletic Centre in Oakville.

2012 NLL
The 2012 entry draft took place on October 1, 2012.

2011 NLL
The 2011 entry draft took place on September 21, 2011.

2010 NLL
The 2010 entry draft took place on September 8, 2010 at the Westin Harbour Castle Hotel in Toronto.

2009 NLL
The 2009 entry draft took place in Buffalo, New York, on September 9.

2008 NLL
The 2008 entry draft took place in Boston, Massachusetts, on September 7.

2007 NLL
The 2007 entry draft took place on September 1, 2007 at the Pepsi Center in Denver.

2006 NLL
The 2006 entry draft took place on September 13, 2006 at the Madison Square Garden in New York City.

2005 NLL
The 2005 entry draft took place on August 29, 2005 at Rexall Place in Edmonton.

2004 NLL

2003 NLL
The 2003 entry draft took place on October 25, 2003 at the Westin Harbour Castle Hotel in Toronto.

2002 NLL
The 2002 entry draft took place on September 17, 2002 at the Air Canada Centre in Toronto.

2001 NLL
The 2001 entry draft took place on August 25, 2001 at the HSBC Arena in Buffalo.

2000 NLL
The 2000 entry draft took place on September 21, 2000 at the Air Canada Centre in Toronto.

1999 NLL
The 1999 entry draft took place on September 21, 1999 at the Marine Midland Arena in Buffalo.

1998 NLL
The 1998 entry draft took place on September 14, 1998 at the ESL Sports Centre in Rochester.

1997 NLL

1996 NLL

Major Indoor Lacrosse League (MILL) 1st Round Draft Selections

1995 MILL

1994 MILL

1993 MILL

1992 MILL

1991 MILL

1990 MILL

1989 MILL

1988 MILL

See also
 National Lacrosse League expansion draft
 National Lacrosse League dispersal draft

External links
 National Lacrosse League Media Guide

References

National Lacrosse League
Drafts (sports)